Robert Elliott's Wholesale Grocery is a historic commercial building located at Hannibal, Marion County, Missouri.  It was built about 1886, and is a two-story brick structure. It features semicircular arches with fanlight tops on the first floor, upper windows with segmental arches, and an applied cornice, possibly metal.

It was added to the National Register of Historic Places in 1986.

References

Commercial buildings on the National Register of Historic Places in Missouri
Commercial buildings completed in 1886
Buildings and structures in Hannibal, Missouri
National Register of Historic Places in Marion County, Missouri
Grocery store buildings